Martin Plüss (born 5 April 1977) is a retired Swiss professional ice hockey centre. He participated in four Winter Olympics and twelve World Championships.

Playing career
A product of EV Dielsdorf-Niederhasli, Plüss made his debut for EHC Kloten in the Swiss top-flight NLA in 1994. He won the Swiss championship with Kloten in 1995 and 1996. In the 2000–2001 season, he received All-NLA Most Valuable Player honours.

In 2004, he left Kloten to join Frölunda HC in the Swedish Elite League and helped the team capture the title in his first year. After signing a one-year deal with Frölunda in 2004, he signed another one-year deal to stay with the team for the 2005–06 season. Despite offers from other teams, Plüss signed yet another one-year contract with Frölunda in 2006. Plüss' contract expired once again in the spring of 2007, but he turned down offers from primarily Swiss teams to instead sign for three years with Frölunda.

After a disappointing 2008 season, Plüss canceled the remaining two years of his contract with Frölunda, stating his game had not developed as expected. He then signed a three-year contract with SC Bern to return to the Swiss NLA. With SCB, he won Swiss championship titles in 2010, 2013, 2016 and 2017. He was recognized with NLA MVP distinction in 2013.

On 16 February 2017 it was announced that Plüss would leave SC Bern after a 9-year stint in the capital city for an unknown destination. He announced his retirement on 16 November 2017.

International play
Plüss competed for the Swiss national team in the 2002, 2006, 2010 and 2014 Winter Olympics as well as in twelve World Championships, winning silver in 2013. He won a total of 236 caps for the Swiss men's national team.

Career statistics

Regular season and playoffs

International

References

External links

1977 births
Frölunda HC players
Ice hockey players at the 2002 Winter Olympics
Ice hockey players at the 2006 Winter Olympics
Ice hockey players at the 2010 Winter Olympics
EHC Kloten players
Living people
Olympic ice hockey players of Switzerland
SC Bern players
Swiss ice hockey centres
Ice hockey players at the 2014 Winter Olympics
People from Bülach
Sportspeople from the canton of Zürich